The 1927–28 international cricket season was from September 1927 to April 1928.

Season overview

October

New Zealand in Australia

December

England in South Africa

February

England in Jamaica

March

Australia in New Zealand

References

International cricket competitions by season
1927 in cricket
1928 in cricket